Markus Pink (born 24 February 1991) is an Austrian professional association footballer who plays for Austrian Bundesliga club Austria Klagenfurt.

Career

Admira Wacker
On 8 January 2020 it was confirmed, that Pink had joined FC Admira Wacker Mödling.

References

External links

1991 births
Living people
Austrian footballers
Austrian Football Bundesliga players
2. Liga (Austria) players
Association football forwards
SK Austria Kärnten players
SK Austria Klagenfurt players
First Vienna FC players
SV Mattersburg players
SK Sturm Graz players
FC Admira Wacker Mödling players
Sportspeople from Klagenfurt
Footballers from Carinthia (state)
Austrian people of English descent